The 1981 McGuinness Men's World Open Squash Championship is the men's edition of the 1981 World Open, which serves as the individual world championship for squash players. The event took place in Toronto in Canada from 19 November until 28 November 1981. Jahangir Khan won his first World Open title, defeating Geoff Hunt in the final.

Seeds

First round

Main Draw

Notes
Geoff Hunt was defeated for the first time in the World Open, every edition of the event which had been inaugurated in 1976 had been won by Geoff Hunt previously.

See also
PSA World Open
1981 Women's World Open Squash Championship

References

External links
World Squash History

M
World Squash Championships
Squash tournaments in Canada
1981 in Canadian sports
International sports competitions hosted by Canada